According to Law act no 6360, new districts are to be established in Turkey by the local elections in 2014.
Some of the new districts will replace the present central districts of provinces and a few will be new establishments.  The following list shows the new districts.

Footnotes

References

Subdivisions of Turkey
New Districts